There will be a total solar eclipse on June 3, 2114. A solar eclipse occurs when the Moon passes between Earth and the Sun, thereby totally or partly obscuring the image of the Sun for a viewer on Earth. A total solar eclipse occurs when the Moon's apparent diameter is larger than the Sun's, blocking all direct sunlight, turning day into darkness. Totality occurs in a narrow path across Earth's surface, with the partial solar eclipse visible over a surrounding region thousands of kilometres wide.

Related eclipses

Saros 139

References 

 NASA Solar eclipses: 2101 to 2200
 NASA graphics
 NASA googlemap of eclipse path

2114 06 03
2114 06 03
2114 06 03
2110s